Anginon streyi is a species of flowering plant in the family Apiaceae. It is endemic to Namibia. Its natural habitat is subtropical or tropical dry shrubland.

References

streyi
Flora of Namibia
Least concern plants
Taxonomy articles created by Polbot